Space system  may refer to:
Spaceflight system, consisting of the space segment, ground segment, and sometimes user segment
Space Systems Center, a generic name for NASA
Space Systems Laboratory (SSL), one of many laboratories in university aerospace engineering departments
Space Systems/Loral (SS/L), a manufacturing subsidiary of Loral Space & Communications
Space radio system, any group of cooperating earth stations and/or space radio stations employing space radiocommunication